The Warren County School District is a public school district in Warren County, Georgia, United States, based in Warrenton. It serves the communities of Camak, Jewell, Norwood, and Warrren.

Schools
The Warren County School District has one elementary school, one middle school, and one high school.

Elementary schools
Mildred E. Freeman Elementary School

Middle school
Warren County Middle School

High school
Warren County High School

References

External links

School districts in Georgia (U.S. state)
Education in Warren County, Georgia